Zhongluotan station, is a station of Line 14 of the Guangzhou Metro. It started operations on 28 December 2018.

The station has 2 elevated island platforms. Trains usually stop at the outer 2 platforms, with the express trains passing through the middle tracks. Platforms 1 and 3 are for trains heading to Dongfeng, whilst platforms 2 and 4 are for trains heading to Jiahewanggang.

Exits
There are 3 exits, lettered A, B1 and B2. Exits A and B1 are accessible. All exits are located on Guangcong No. 7 Road.

Gallery

References

 Railway stations in China opened in 2018
 Guangzhou Metro stations in Baiyun District